Little Criminals is a 1977 album by Randy Newman.  Like most of Newman's work, the album eschews traditional pop-music themes ("I'll Be Home" is the only love song on the album) in favor of musical story-telling, often featuring quirky characters and cynical views. The first song on the album – "Short People" – became a hit single in its own right. The album itself peaked at #9 on the US Billboard 200 chart, Newman's highest-charting album to date.

Some of the instrumental work and backing vocals on the album are performed by members of the Eagles. In particular, Glenn Frey played guitar on two tracks, Joe Walsh played guitar on three tracks, and Don Henley and Tim Schmit sang background vocals on one track each. Frey and J. D. Souther, who had earlier been the duo Longbranch Pennywhistle, sang background vocals on three tracks.

Newman wrote, conducted and played keyboards on all tracks. Synthesizers were programmed by Michael Boddicker.

In September 1977 the British music magazine NME published the following interview with Newman talking sardonically about his then new release: "There's one song about a child murderer," Newman deadpans. "That's fairly optimistic. Maybe. There's one called 'Jolly Coppers on Parade' which isn't an absolutely anti-police song. Maybe it's even a fascist song.  I didn't notice at the time. There's also one about me as a cowboy called 'Rider in the Rain'. I think it's ridiculous. The Eagles are on there. That's what's good about it. There's also this song 'Short People'. It's purely a joke. I like other ones on the album better but the audiences go for that one."

It placed 8th in the 1977 Pazz & Jop Critics Poll, and in 2000 it was voted number 468 in Colin Larkin's All Time Top 1000 Albums.

Record World said that the single "Baltimore" "is as serious as 'Short People' was funny, and its haunting melody and dramatic lyric linger well."

"Baltimore" was covered by Nina Simone, Nils Lofgren, The Tamlins, David Gray, Billy Mackenzie, Lianne La Havas, Jazmine Sullivan, Mink Stole, Portuguese band Coldfinger and Nedric Nedo. "In Germany Before the War" was covered by British band Diesel Park West on their covers album "God Only Knows" in 1992. The song "I'll Be Home", meanwhile, had been written by Newman years previously, and was originally recorded in 1970 by Harry Nilsson on his album Nilsson Sings Newman and by Tim Hardin on his 1972 album Painted Head.

The album's cover artwork is a photographic portrait of Randy Newman by celebrity photographer and graphic artist Bob Seidemann. It features Newman standing on the West 7th Street overpass above the I-110 freeway in the Financial District of Los Angeles.

Track listing

Personnel
 Randy Newman - vocals, keyboards and synthesizer
 Michael Boddicker - additional synthesizer and synthesizer programming

 "Short People" – 2:54
 Glenn Frey, J.D. Souther, Tim Schmit - backing vocals
 Klaus Voormann - bass
 Milt Holland - congas
 Jim Keltner - drums
 Waddy Wachtel - guitar
 "You Can't Fool The Fatman" – 2:44
 Willie Weeks - bass
 Milt Holland - congas
 Andy Newmark - drums
 "Little Criminals" – 3:04
 Willie Weeks - bass
 Andy Newmark, Rick Marotta - drums
 Glenn Frey - guitar
 Joe Walsh - guitar, slide guitar
 Milt Holland - percussion
 "Texas Girl at the Funeral of Her Father" – 2:40
 Ralph Grierson - piano
 "Jolly Coppers on Parade" – 3:46
 Klaus Voormann - bass
 Milt Holland - congas
 Jim Keltner - drums, temple blocks
 Waddy Wachtel - guitar
 "In Germany Before the War" – 3:39
 No contributions are specified
 "Sigmund Freud's Impersonation of Albert Einstein in America" – 3:02
 Willie Weeks - bass
 Jim Keltner - drums
 "Baltimore" – 4:02
 Glenn Frey, J.D. Souther - backing vocals
 Willie Weeks - bass
 Andy Newmark, Rick Marotta - drums
 Glenn Frey - guitar
 Milt Holland - percussion
 "I'll Be Home" – 2:47
 Klaus Voormann - bass
 Jim Keltner - drums
 Waddy Wachtel - guitar
 "Rider in the Rain" – 3:54
 Don Henley, Glenn Frey, J.D. Souther - backing vocals
 Willie Weeks - bass
 Rick Marotta - drums
 Waddy Wachtel - guitar
 "Kathleen (Catholicism Made Easier)" – 3:35
 Willie Weeks - bass
 Rick Marotta - drums
 Joe Walsh - guitar
 Ry Cooder - mandolin
 "Old Man on the Farm" – 2:14
 Randy Newman - piano
Technical
Lee Herschberg, Loyd Clifft - engineer
Mike Salisbury - cover design
Bob Seidemann - cover photography at 1013 7th Street, Los Angeles, California

Charts

Weekly charts

Year-end charts

Sales and certifications

References

1977 albums
Randy Newman albums
Albums produced by Russ Titelman
Albums produced by Lenny Waronker
Warner Records albums
Albums arranged by Randy Newman
Albums conducted by Randy Newman